The Cooperative Web or Co-Web refers to a browser-based platform that promises to replicate the power of face-to-face communications via web-touch without sacrificing the quality of human interactions. A Co-Web enabled
situational application exploits direct high-definition video mixed with web based telepresence to further increase conversational productivity. The objective of the Cooperative Web is to enrich collaborative web meetings with a browser metaphor that supports simultaneous interactions between meeting participants.

Overview 
A convergence is occurring between various technologies associated with the notion of live web meetings. The phrase Web conferencing has been used to describe group discussions over the internet. These discussions are often implemented using Synchronous conferencing protocols and are commonly used for webinars, where one meeting participant lectures to other participants while presenting some information that is rendered to all participants by a common client application (web or fat client). The term telepresence refers to a set of technologies which allow a person to feel as if they were present, to give the appearance that they were present, or to have an effect, at a location other than their true location. Telepresence requires that the senses of the user, or users, are provided with such stimuli as to give the feeling of being in that other location. Additionally, users may be given the ability to affect the remote location.  As the analysts at IDC describe, the goal is to create a sensory experience that communicates the full range of human interactions in a live meeting.

While many telepresence solutions have focused on the ambiance aspects of remote meeting environments and while most web conferencing solutions have focused on the integration of webinar and telephony features into collaboration software offerings/services, little has been done to simulate or reflect the asynchronous or simultaneous aspects of live meetings over the internet. Ideally what is required is a set of technologies that enrich communications with sensory elements that provide a just-like-being-there experience for live meetings. The sensory experience should include a range of sight, sound, and touch interactions. However, the current state of web conferencing and telepresence solutions focus mainly on the sight and sound aspects of a meeting and fall short on the interaction capabilities of participants. Moreover, web conferencing and telepresence solutions are typically not vendor neutral and tend to be pricey.

Users have the ability to incorporate webinar capabilities into an immersive or adaptive telepresence solution to extend meeting attendance. Yet this injection of telepresence Lite capabilities all along the telepresence solution spectrum still does not address support for simultaneous interactions with the material being presented in a meeting.

Orthogonal to this convergence in the technologies that support live web meetings, the web browser platform has evolved to a point whereby the mediation of user interactions amongst meeting attendees is possible. The common browser has raised the bar of expectation by users. Regardless of your browser of choice, your ability to access web applications simply and efficiently has become the norm. The overall browser experience has improved due in part by the broad adoption of web standards by browser providers and by the sheer economics and reach of the web browser platform. Essentially, the browser has evolved into the ubiquitous application container for the web.

Solution concepts 
People meet, gather, huddle for business and personal endeavors. The majority of the discussions associated with these conferencing activities tend to be associated with decisions. Typically, the decision making process incorporates the analysis of one or more visualizations of data. The Cooperative Web pertains to a set of technologies and associated architectures that promise to empower decision agility with respect to information available for evaluation via web-based applications.

While cooperative web solutions can incorporate digital components (audio, video) to replicate the face-face meeting experience with the human sensory elements of sight and sound, the interactive sensory element is a differentiating factor.  A core value proposition of this technology is that it provides all meeting participants with the ability to manipulate data and drive web centric applications that are used in the decision making process.

In consideration to IDC's call for the ability to develop a low-cost plug-and-play telepresence solution that can be easily adopted by medium-sized companies to extend the reach and promise of telepresence, the
Cooperative Web offers solution vendors and composite web application developers the ability to develop standards based web applications that can be used in collaborative communication-oriented meetings.

Sample solution scenarios characteristics 
 Webinar whereby Audio, Video and Co-Web enabled applications are combined
 Traditional teleconference or phone conversations aided by a Co-Web enabled application (this would be useful when broadband limitations exists or when video cameras are not present)
 Ad hoc just-in-time web conference
 Video conferencing meeting whereby a remote mobile attendee is required

Solution scenarios 
 TeleMedicine: Remote health care or diagnosis
 E-Learning or Distance Learning
 Call Center Support
 Financial Analyst Briefing

Conceptual architecture 
The maturity of service-oriented-architectures has fueled an ecosystem of ajax-based gadgets (widgets) that encapsulate content services. These gadgets, standalone fragments of a web page, make up the information rich web palette that can be assembled, wired and shared in composite web applications.

Assume that the gadgets used in a given web page all publish the events associated with user-interactions to a predefined mediation server whereby all participants in a managed web meeting were notified of the interactions, then each instance of the gadgets in the web page (running in each meeting participants browser) would receive these remote interaction events as if they were locally triggered. The result would be that each meeting participant would broadcast his/her web page interactions and also subscribe to the results associated with interactions of other meeting participants.

Comparison with telepresence 
The following attributes most common associated with Telepresence solutions are
 Quality of Image
 True Eye Contact
 Life Size Image
 Proximity of image
 Sound quality
 Full complement of content presentation capabilities

The reality is that many of top selling solutions focus more on the features associated with sight and sound and complementary ambiance aspects like high-end furniture. However, few focus on extending the telepresence experience with interactive presentation capabilities. Cooperative web enabled applications are complementary to the spectrum of telepresence solutions as they extend the scope of the browser-based platform to allow all meeting participants to share browser applications in a live online meeting.

As described by Gartner, the spectrum of Telepresence solutions can range from Lite to Adaptive to Immersive. Cooperative Web enabled applications can be leveraged along all points on the solution spectrum to help enrich the just-like-being-there aspects of the telepresence experience.

Typically, sophisticated technologies are required for a user to be given a convincing telepresence experience. However, one of the benefits of cooperative web solutions is the ubiquity of the technology dependencies. The cost of entry for adoption has been reduced to a common browser, a few JavaScript libraries and some browser plug-ins. The net result is that the cooperative web not only extends the reach of telepresence solutions, this technology also improves the overall experience of remote communications.

However, in its raw state, a co-web enabled application does not require a telepresence environment nor a hosted web conferencing solution. The minimum requirement is a mediation server and a co-web enabled application.

See also 
 Open Cooperative Web Framework, a Dojo Foundation Project
 Mashups
 Synchronous conferencing
 Open Mashup Alliance

References 

 "Gartner MarketScope for Video Telepresence Solutions (G00156551)", Costello, Morrison, 2008.
 "IDC Worldwide Telepresence 2008-2012 Forecast and Analysis", Freedman, Doyle, 2008.
 An Architecture of Participation, O'Reilly, 2008.
 Here Comes Everybody: The Power of Organizing Without Organizations, Shirky, 2008.
 "IDC: What You Need to Know about Telepresence and HD Videoconferencing", Germanow, October 2007.

Computer-mediated communication